"Never Be You" is a song written by Tom Petty and Benmont Tench and was first released in 1983 by Maria McKee. The song appeared on the "Streets of Fire" film soundtrack album and was recorded by American country music artist Rosanne Cash. Cash recorded a version for the film, but her version was not used. Cash's version was released in September 1985 as the second single from the album Rhythm & Romance. The song was Cash's fifth number one on the country chart. The single went to number one for one week and spent a total of 16 weeks on the chart.

Chart performance

References

1985 singles
Billboard Hot Country Songs number-one singles of the year
1985 songs
Rosanne Cash songs
Songs written by Tom Petty
Songs written by Benmont Tench
Song recordings produced by David Malloy
Columbia Records singles
Song recordings produced by Rodney Crowell